Saint Augustine and Alypius Receiving Ponticianus is a 1414–1415 painting by Nicolò di Pietro, which has been in the collection of the Musée des Beaux-Arts de Lyon since 2009.
The painting illustrates the episode of Saint Augustine of Hippo's conversion.

Sources

1410s paintings
Paintings of Augustine of Hippo
Paintings in the collection of the Museum of Fine Arts of Lyon
Books in art
Chess paintings
13th century in chess